Invest Odisha is part of the Ministry of Industries Administration of the Government of Odisha to promote national and foreign direct investment to Odisha. Invest Odisha is spearheading the investment promotion campaign for Odisha. This team was previously referred to as Team Odisha. Industrial facilitation and investment promotion are the key roles of Invest Odisha.

Portals

GO Care
GO Care is Government of Odisha's Corporate Social Responsibility (CSR) Administration and Responsive Engagement Portal.

GO Plus
GO Plus is Government of Odisha's Geographic Information System (GIS) based Industrial Land Use and Infrastructure Information System.

GO Smile
GO Smile is Government of Odisha's Synchronized Mechanism for Inspection of Licensed Enterprises.

GO Swift    
GO Swift is Government of Odisha's Online Single Window Portal i.e. Single Window for Investor Facilitation and Tracking. It is developed and initiated to transform the B2G interface through the entire investment life cycle.

See also

Economy of Odisha
Make in Odisha
Make in India
Government of Odisha

References

Manufacturing in India 
Advertising in India
Entrepreneurship in India
Indian advertising slogans
Economic history of India (1947–present)